Bechet is a town in Dolj County, Oltenia, Romania, on the river Danube, opposite the Bulgarian city of Oryahovo.

Demographics

In 2011, it had a population of 3,363.

Gallery

Points of interests 
At Bechet Port, there is a 126.5 metres tall unused electricity pylon, which was built in 1967 as part of the Danube crossing of the 220 kV-line Ișalnița-Kozlodui and which is since the demolition of this line the only relict of it .

References

External links

Official website

Populated places in Dolj County
Localities in Oltenia
Populated places on the Danube
Towns in Romania
Port cities and towns in Romania
Bulgaria–Romania border crossings
Romani communities in Romania